Wendy Burrell (born 16 May 1952) is a retired British international swimmer. She competed in three events at the 1968 Summer Olympics. In the medley relay she competed with Margaret Auton, Dorothy Harrison and Alexandra Jackson and they came sixth.

She represented England in the backstroke and medley events, at the 1970 British Commonwealth Games in Edinburgh, Scotland. At the ASA National British Championships she won the 110 yards backstroke title in 1968 and the 200 metres backstroke title twice (1968, 1970).

References

External links
 

1952 births
Living people
British female swimmers
Olympic swimmers of Great Britain
Swimmers at the 1968 Summer Olympics
Sportspeople from Carlisle, Cumbria
Swimmers at the 1970 British Commonwealth Games
Commonwealth Games competitors for England
Female backstroke swimmers
20th-century British women
21st-century British women